Orris Kay Dalton (May 4, 1932 – August 22, 2022) was an American former gridiron football coach.  He served as the head football coach at Western State College of Colorado—now known as Western Colorado University—from 1961 to 1965 and Northern Colorado University from 2000 to 2005, compiling a career college football coaching record of 71–43.  Dalton was also the head coach for the Montreal Alouettes of the Canadian Football League  (CFL) from 1967 to 1969, tallying a mark of 7–31–4.

Biography
Dalton began coaching in 1958 as Trinidad State Junior College's head coach. In 1961, he became head coach of Western State College.  He had a 33–12 record at WSC, and in 1964 led the Mountaineers to the Mineral Water Bowl.  In his five seasons as coach, he led WSC to four Rocky Mountain Conference championships.

Dalton moved to the professional ranks in 1966 as the defensive coordinator of the Montreal Alouettes.  In 1967, he was promoted to head coach after Darrell Mudra resigned to coach at the University of Arizona.  Dalton was fired after the 1969 season and was replaced by the team's former quarterback, Sam Etcheverry.  He had a 7–31–4 record over three seasons.  In 1970, he stayed in the CFL, becoming the offensive line and wide receiver coach of the BC Lions.

In 1971, Dalton returned to college football as quarterbacks coach of the Colorado Buffaloes. He coached the Buffaloes' quarterbacks for two seasons before being reassigned as a recruiting officer at Colorado.

He returned to the pros in 1974 as the wide receivers coach for the Denver Broncos. In 1977, he joined Lou Saban's coaching staff, serving as the receivers coach of the Buffalo Bills. After not being retained by Chuck Knox, Dalton held the same position with the Kansas City Chiefs under Marv Levy, another former Alouettes coach. After Levy was fired, he moved to the Houston Oilers coaching staff as offensive coordinator under Ed Biles, Chuck Studley, and Hugh Campbell. In 1985, he rejoined Buffalo Bills as quarterbacks coach before returning to the Broncos the following season as special offensive assistant coach.

In 1987, he returned to his alma mater Colorado State University as the team's offensive coordinator. In 1989, he became the offensive coordinator at the University of Northern Colorado, a position he would hold for 11 years before his promotion to head coach.  The Bears won Division II national championships in 1996 and 1997. Quarterback Corte McGuffey won the Harlon Hill Trophy as the NCAA Division II college football player of the year in 1999.

In 2000, Dalton was promoted to head coach when Joe Glenn accepted the same position at the University of Montana. He would guide the team through the early portion of the school's transition from Division II to Division I (I-AA in football). He was relieved of his duties December 2, 2005, by athletic director Jay Hinrichs.  Dalton had a 38–31 record in six seasons as the Bears' head coach.

Head coaching record

College

References

1932 births
2022 deaths
American football ends
BC Lions coaches
Buffalo Bills coaches
Colorado Buffaloes football coaches
Colorado State Rams football coaches
Colorado State Rams football players
Denver Broncos coaches
Houston Oilers coaches
Kansas City Chiefs coaches
Montreal Alouettes coaches
Northern Colorado Bears football coaches
Western Colorado Mountaineers football coaches
Junior college football coaches in the United States
People from Moab, Utah